Gerald Long (born July 9, 1944) is an American politician. He served as a Republican member for the 31st district of the Louisiana State Senate.

Long was born in Winnfield, Louisiana. He was the brother of Jimmy D. Long, and his paternal grandfather was Gillis William Long. Other relatives were the politicians George S. Long, Huey Long, Earl Long, Russell B. Long and Speedy Long. Long attended Northwestern State University, where he earned his degree in 1966.

In 2008, Long was elected for the 31st district of the Louisiana State Senate. He succeeded Mike Smith. Long was succeeded by Louie Bernard in 2020.

References 

1944 births
Living people
People from Winnfield, Louisiana
Republican Party Louisiana state senators
21st-century American politicians
Northwestern State University alumni
Long family